Sai Tso Wan ( or ) is a former bay in the west shore near the centre of Tsing Yi Island, Hong Kong. Its reclamation started in the 1960s. The bay has several heavy industry facilities, such oil storages and docks.

The Chinese name Sai Tso Wan means the bay of Rubia cordifolia. Correctly, pronounced as Sin Tso Wan rather than Sai Tso Wan. For the sake of convenience, the Chinese name is sometimes written using characters with the same pronunciation, Sai Tso Wan, which means the bay of west grass.

Tsing Yi
Bays of Hong Kong